Mirim Çelebi was a 16th-century Ottoman astronomer. Çelebi was an honorific title meaning "gentleman".

His father Kutbiddin Muhammed was the grandson of the famous Ottoman astronomer Ali Kuşçu (1403–1474). Mirim Çelebi was born in İstanbul. After the death of his father, he was trained by his maternal grandfather. He served in the madrasas of Gelibolu, Edirne, Bursa and finally İstanbul as a scholar. Sultan Bayazıt II (reigned 1481–1512) invited him to the palace as a mathematics teacher.

He was also an expert of Islamic Law. During the reign of Selim I (r. 1512–1520), he briefly served as Anatolian  kazasker, a high-ranked judge. In 1519, he retired and spent the rest of his life in Edirne. Mirim Çelebi died in Edirne, and was laid to rest in the graveyard of Evliya Kasim Pasha Mosque.

His main book was on optics.

References

15th-century births
Astronomers from the Ottoman Empire
15th-century astronomers
16th-century astronomers
1525 deaths
Hanafis